César Gómez del Rey (born 23 October 1967) is a Spanish retired footballer who played as a central defender.

He was best known for being part of the Tenerife sides that consolidated in La Liga into consecutive UEFA Cup presences. Over the course of seven seasons, he amassed totals in the former competition of 217 games and five goals, also representing Valladolid.

Football career
Gómez was born in Madrid. He unsuccessfully graduated from Real Madrid's youth system, and made his professional debuts in 1990 with Real Valladolid, being relegated from La Liga in his second year.

Gómez joined fellow league team CD Tenerife in summer 1992, being instrumental as they qualified for the UEFA Cup in his debut campaign. Moreover, he played in the last league round against his alma mater, as Tenerife won and the Merengues lost the national title for the second consecutive year against the same team.

In 1997, after roughly 200 overall appearances for the Canarians, Gómez was signed by Serie A club A.S. Roma on a lucrative four-year contract, arriving at the same time as compatriot Iván Helguera. However, he only played a total of 87 minutes in his first season, including a lone start in a Derby della Capitale 1–3 defeat to 10-man S.S. Lazio; he was successively removed from the first team following his refusal for a release by mutual consent, and spent the following three years without appearing in a single match.
 
Gómez retired in 2001 after his contract expired, but stayed in the city, where he had opened a car shop in the EUR neighbourhood in the meantime. It was then revealed he had been signed by Roma following a mistake from the club directors, who actually were interested in fellow Tenerife defender Pablo Paz.

References

External links

1967 births
Living people
Footballers from Madrid
Spanish footballers
Association football defenders
La Liga players
Segunda División players
Real Madrid Castilla footballers
Real Valladolid players
CD Tenerife players
Serie A players
A.S. Roma players
Spanish expatriate footballers
Expatriate footballers in Italy
Spanish expatriate sportspeople in Italy